Cornetto may refer to:

 Cornett, a musical wind instrument, often called cornetto to distinguish it from the cornet
 Cornetto (frozen dessert), a branded frozen ice cream cone
 Three Flavours Cornetto trilogy, a British film series
 Cornetto (pastry), an Italian pastry
 Cornetto (Città di Castello), a frazione of Città di Castello, in Italy
 Cornicello, another word for cornetto - a good luck charm in the shape of a small horn
 Monte Cornetto, a mountain in Italy.